Howick is the third smallest municipality in the Canadian province of Quebec, located in Le Haut-Saint-Laurent Regional County Municipality. The population as of the Canada 2021 Census was 850. Situated along the English River in the heart of the Chateauguay Valley, it is approximately 50 minutes southwest of Montreal and 20 minutes north of the Canada–United States border.

Geography

Lakes & Rivers
The following waterways pass through or are situated within the municipality's boundaries:
English River – runs south to north along Howick's southeast boundary

Demographics

Population

Language

Attractions
Located outside Howick, in the hamlet of Allan's Corners, is the site of the Battle of the Chateauguay, where on October 25, 1813 Canadian and Native forces fought and repelled an invading American force that was planning to attack Montreal during the War of 1812. There is a National Parks of Canada museum near the site of the battle.

Transportation
The CIT du Haut-Saint-Laurent provides commuter and local bus services.

See also
 Le Haut-Saint-Laurent Regional County Municipality
 Chateauguay River
 List of municipalities in Quebec

References

Municipalities in Quebec
Incorporated places in Le Haut-Saint-Laurent Regional County Municipality